Artdc.org is an artist collective in the Washington, D.C., area with over 2000 artists of all mediums. Artdc.org has helped organize various artist-run initiative projects including group shows in transitional spaces.

According to their mission statement, artdc.org aims to bridge the communication gap between artists, galleries, and collectors through its online bulletin board forums and automated galleries as well as organizing face-to-face meetings and events. The forum provides a way to share techniques, self-promote, and discuss many themes of art. This aids cross-communication  between various members of the art community and helps inspire new and different forms of creativity. Artdc.org provides individuals the opportunity to network and form relationships with others, allowing a stronger community to develop.  Artdc.org represents the community, while artdc.com represents the art space and studios.

Collaborations
Artdc.org has developed collaborations with local organizations through interaction including marketing, event organization, art discussion, and more.  Collaborations include, but are not limited to:
  Artomatic - Artomatic is a month-long multimedia arts event and Organization
  Capital Fringe Festival - Capital Fringe, a non-profit organization, connects exploratory artists with adventurous audiences
  Art Outlet - Amplifying the artist's voice.
 The DC Conspiracy - A group of comic creators, writers, artists, editors, and more.
  88 -  A pro-active community
 Studio - an artdc.org member developed a studio in North East DC, and Hyattsville, MD.
 Art Space - artdc in Hyattsville, a store front gallery in Maryland
 art reactor - The art reactor is a collaborative arts education studio project

External links
 Washington Post Article
  Washington City Paper Article
  Washingtonian Blog
 Artdc.org Mission Statement
 Artomatic's  Wikipedia page

References
 artdc Gallery in the Express, 2009
 Wonkette 2009-03-06 "Moca Review"
 Falls Church News Press 2009-04-01 "Excellent Finds"
What's your problem City Paper note
 Washington, Post 2007 Article

American artist groups and collectives
Arts organizations based in Washington, D.C.